Limestone University, formerly Limestone College, is a private Christian university in Gaffney, South Carolina. It was established in 1845 by Thomas Curtis, a distinguished scholar born and educated in England. Limestone was the first women's college in South Carolina and one of the first in the nation; it is the third-oldest college in South Carolina. Ten buildings on the campus, as well as the Limestone Springs and limestone quarry itself, are on the National Register of Historic Places. In the 1960s, Limestone became fully coeducational and in 2020 its name changed from Limestone College to its current name of Limestone University.

In addition to its traditional Day Campus located in Gaffney, SC, the university provides an Online Program degree path, along with Student Service Centers in Charleston, Columbia, Gaffney, Greenville, and Florence.

Academics 
Over 80% of the faculty at Limestone hold the terminal degree in their field, and the student/faculty ratio is 14:1.  Limestone offers students 57 majors in four different divisions of study: Arts and Letters, Natural Sciences, Social and Behavioral Sciences, and Professional Studies. Additionally, in addition to free, reasonable accommodations through the Accessibility Office, Limestone University offers a comprehensive support program, LEAP (Learning Enrichment & Achievement Program), for Day Campus students with learning and attention challenges.

The new 58,000-square-foot Hines-Riggins Center was completed in 2021 and houses the campus library, campus store, student center, art gallery, meeting and study rooms, and dining options.  It serves as the academic and social hub of the campus.

Limestone offers an online Master of Business Administration, as well as an MBA concentration in Healthcare Administration. A Master of Social Work degree is also available online, along with an RN-to-BSN Nursing Program.

In December 2019, Limestone announced an articulation agreement with the Edward Via College of Osteopathic Medicine (VCOM), which is a doctoral-level osteopathic medical college with a nearby campus in Spartanburg. Limestone’s partnership with VCOM provides its Pre-Medical students an opportunity to receive a Guaranteed Admissions Interview, as well as take part in an Early Admission Program.

Athletics 

Limestone plays sports in the South Atlantic Conference (SAC). Limestone offers competitive opportunities at the NCAA Division II level for men in football, soccer, basketball, baseball, wrestling, lacrosse, golf, cross country, tennis, track and field, and volleyball and for women in golf, volleyball, basketball, softball, tennis, soccer, cross country, lacrosse, cheerleading, track and field, acrobatics/tumbling, wrestling, and field hockey. Limestone has an indoor Olympic-size pool for intramural and recreational use, along with a Physical Education facility containing classrooms, offices, locker rooms, Athletic Training Education facilities for the school's fully accredited Athletic Training program, a fitness center, and a wrestling practice facility.

Clubs and organizations
Clubs and organizations at the university include academics, religious, leadership, musical, theatre, and special interest affiliations. Students also contribute to a yearbook and a literary magazine of poems, essays, short stories, and art.

The college has a Reserve Officers' Training Corps program for students interested in serving in the military or reserves.

Notable alumni 

 Jay Byars, '09, reality TV show contestant, Survivor: One World
 Lois Collier, actress
 Alphonza Gadsden, bishop of the Reformed Episcopal Church
 Ann Gordon McCrory, First Lady of North Carolina
 Mark Mathabane, South African author
 Bob Peeler, '74, former Lieutenant Governor of South Carolina
 Gaylord Perry, Hall of Fame Major League Baseball player
 Kevin Pucetas, '06, professional baseball player, Kansas City Royals
 Eleanor P. Sheppard, first female mayor of Richmond, Virginia
 Vyncint Smith, NFL wide receiver, Tampa Bay Buccaneers

References

External links 
 
 Official athletics website

 
Private universities and colleges in South Carolina
Education in Cherokee County, South Carolina
Educational institutions established in 1845
Universities and colleges accredited by the Southern Association of Colleges and Schools
Buildings and structures in Cherokee County, South Carolina
1845 establishments in South Carolina